Shreve's least gecko (Sphaerodactylus shrevei), also known commonly as  the northwest Haiti blotched sphaero and the northwest Haitian blotched geckolet, is an endangered species of lizard in the family Sphaerodactylidae. The species is endemic to Haiti.

Etymology
The specific name, shrevei, is in honor of American herpetologist Benjamin Shreve.

Habitat

Description
Dorsally, S. shrevei is ash gray, with a dorsal pattern that is blotched (rather than lineate). Ventrally, it is uniform white.

Reproduction
S. shrevei is oviparous.

References

Further reading
Lazell JD (1961). "A New Species of Sphaerodactylus from Northern Haiti". Breviora (139): 1–5. (Sphaerodactylus shrevei, new species).
Rösler H (2000). "Kommentierte Liste der rezent, subrezent und fossil bekannten Geckotaxa (Reptilia: Gekkonomorpha)". Gekkota 2: 28–153. (Sphaerodactylus shrevei, p. 114). (in German).
Schwartz A, Henderson RW (1991). Amphibians and Reptiles of the West Indies: Descriptions, Distributions, and Natural History. Gainesville, Florida: University of Florida Press. 720 pp. . (Sphaerodactylus shrevei, p. 535).
Schwartz A, Thomas R (1975). A Check-list of West Indian Amphibians and Reptiles. Carnegie Museum of Natural History Special Publication No. 1. Pittsburgh, Pennsylvania: Carnegie Museum of Natural History. 216 pp. (Sphaerodactylus shrevei, p. 162).

Sphaerodactylus
Endemic fauna of Haiti
Reptiles of Haiti
Reptiles described in 1961